The Washington Park Sewage Pumping Station is an historic wastewater pumping facility in Providence, Rhode Island. This building stands atop a large cast-in-place concrete well, in which pumps and gate valves are housed. The pump station is located well back from the street, behind a low brick distribution facility. It was added to the National Register of Historic Places in 1989.

History
The Washington Park Sewage Pumping Station was designed under the supervision of Otis F. Clapp, the then-current Office of City Engineer for Providence. The construction was also overseen by Frederick O. Clapp, Assistant Engineer.

The sewer system for the Washington Park district was ordered on July 31, 1912, and completed by October 16, 1913.

In 1915, it was estimated that  of sewage was pumped by the pumping station. About 225 houses were connected to the sewer system that lead to the pumping station, but it was reported that due to the sewer system that it furthered the demand for "higher quality homes" in the area.

Significance
The Washington Park Sewage Pumping Station is historically significant as part of Providence's community planning and development in regards to the processing and treatment of sewage for the growing city. Re-annexed by Providence in 1868, the Washington Park area remained largely undeveloped until public transportation made the area accessible. Continuous residential growth from the late 1890s into the 1930s required the extension of the sewage system. It is a representative example of city planning for sewage treatment with a longstanding functionality with its structural integrity. The facility was listed on the National Register of Historic Places in 1989.

See also

National Register of Historic Places listings in Providence, Rhode Island

References

External links

Industrial buildings and structures on the National Register of Historic Places in Rhode Island
Sewerage infrastructure on the National Register of Historic Places
Buildings and structures in Providence, Rhode Island
Historic American Engineering Record in Rhode Island
National Register of Historic Places in Providence, Rhode Island